Poliaenus californicus is a species of beetle in the family Cerambycidae. It was described by Schaeffer in 1908. It is known from the United States.

References

Pogonocherini
Beetles described in 1908